Elkanah Brackin (or Bracken) Greer (October 11, 1825 – March 25, 1877) was an antebellum cotton planter, merchant, and then a general in the Confederate States Army who served in the Western Theater of the American Civil War.

Biography
Greer was born in Paris, Tennessee. He moved to Mississippi as a young man and took part in the Mexican–American War as a member of the 1st Mississippi Rifles, whose colonel was future Confederate President Jefferson Davis. He participated in the battles of Monterrey and Buena Vista.

In 1848, Greer moved to Marshall, Texas, where he established himself as a planter and merchant, and for a time was a partner in a law firm. Three years later, he returned to Tennessee to marry a local girl named Anna Holcombe (whose famous sister Lucy Petway Holcombe married Francis Wilkinson Pickens, and became known during the Civil War as the "Queen of the Confederacy").  Elkanah and Anna had five children. He became the grand commander of the secretive Knights of the Golden Circle organization in 1859.

With the secession of Texas, Greer enlisted in the army and was commissioned as the first colonel of the newly formed the South Kansas-Texas Cavalry (later known as the 3rd Texas Cavalry) in July 1861. After training and equipping his men, he led the regiment into combat at the battles of Wilson's Creek and Elkhorn Tavern in Arkansas. During the latter engagement, Greer was slightly wounded in the arm.

In October 1862, he was promoted to the rank of brigadier general and appointed as chief of the conscription bureau for the Trans-Mississippi region. Among his many responsibilities was trying to reconcile the laws of the central Confederate government with those of the State of Texas.

In 1864, faced with a growing manpower shortage, the Confederacy formed a Reserve Corps department, and Greer commanded it for a time.

After the war, he resumed his civilian career as a planter and merchant. He died during a visit with his sister in DeValls Bluff, Arkansas, on March 25, 1877.

Greer is buried in Elmwood Cemetery in Memphis, Tennessee.

See alsos

 List of American Civil War generals (Confederate)

Notes

References
 Eicher, John H., and David J. Eicher, Civil War High Commands. Stanford: Stanford University Press, 2001. .
 Evans, Greer bio
 McGehee, Larry T.  "Iron Fist in a Velvet Glove," August 5, 2002, Southern Seen, Wofford College web site
 Sifakis, Stewart. Who Was Who in the Civil War. New York: Facts On File, 1988. .
 Warner, Ezra J. Generals in Gray: Lives of the Confederate Commanders. Baton Rouge: Louisiana State University Press, 1959. .

External links
 
 "Greer, Elkanah Bracken," Handbook of Texas Online
 New texas Handbook
 

1825 births
1877 deaths
People from Paris, Tennessee
Confederate States Army brigadier generals
People of Tennessee in the American Civil War
People of Texas in the American Civil War
American military personnel of the Mexican–American War
Texas lawyers
American planters
19th-century American lawyers
Knights of the Golden Circle